Crossfaith (クロスフェイス) is a Japanese metalcore band from Osaka that was formed in 2006, consists of Kenta Koie (vocals), Kazuki Takemura (guitar), Hiroki Ikegawa (bass), Tatsuya Amano (drums), and Terufumi Tamano (keyboards). The band released their first demo Blueprint of Reconstruction in 2008, since then they have released 4 studio albums, 1 demo, 6 EPs, 24 singles and 27 music videos.

Their third studio album, Apocalyze, became their first album which charted on US Billboard. It peaked at number 13 on Billboard Heatseekers Albums, and reached number 18 on Billboard Hard Rock Albums.

Albums

Studio albums

Demos

Extended plays

Singles

Music videos

Other appearances

Singles

Music videos

Notes

References

Discographies of Japanese artists